Murtho is a locality in South Australia. It is northeast of Renmark and Paringa. It is bounded by the Murray River on its north and west sides and the Victorian border on the east.

Land around Murtho today is used for vineyards and orchards irrigated from the Murray River, and cereal crops. It has a boat ramp and shop which supports campers and recreational fishing.

The Village Settlements established under Part VII of the Crown Lands Amendment Act 1893 was mostly used by unemployed people seeking a fresh start during an economic depression. Murtho was different in that it required financial commitment by the members and no government handouts. Chairman of the Murtho Co-operative Village Settlement Association was Henry Cordeaux ( –1902). By 1897, Murtho had  under irrigation. However, by 1899, Murtho settlement had, like many others, been largely abandoned. The settlement failed chiefly through inadequate irrigation — the settlement was atop a  cliff. The cost of transporting provisions and produce by river was exorbitant (dearer per ton than from London to Adelaide), and rabbits took much of their crop: they bypassed the wire netting fences by scaling the cliffs! Among the Murtho settlers were brothers John Napier Birks (1845–1929) and Walter Richard Birks (1847–1900), of Adelaide's prominent Birks family.

Before Australian federation in 1900, Murtho was the site of the South Australian customs house known as Border Cliffs, charging import duty on goods being brought down the river from New South Wales and Victoria.

In the 1960s, Murtho almost became the south bank (actually east end of the dam wall) of the Chowilla Dam. This dam would have impounded a vast area (mostly upstream of the state borders in New South Wales and Victoria) in a relatively shallow reservoir to provide security of water supply to South Australia. Preparations were made to build the dam, including a railway line built in 1967 to cart rock for the construction, however the increasing cost estimates and environmental concerns meant that the dam was deferred then cancelled.

Heritage listings

Murtho has a number of heritage-listed sites, including:

 Lock 6 Road: Graves of Passengers of the PS Bunyip
 Wilkinson Road: Wilkadene
 Murtho Road: Border Cliffs Customs House

References

Towns in South Australia
Riverland